Michael Post (born February 20, 1952) is a German painter,  Object artist and curator. He is an exponent of concrete art.
[[file:Ohne Titel, Acryl auf Fiberglas über Stahl, 2016 (1).jpg|thumb|Acrylic on fiberglass above Steel (1), 2016. An Artwork by Michael Post]]

 Biography 
Michael Post studied fine arts at the University of Applied Sciences in Wiesbaden with Professor Robert Preyer from 1972 to 1976 and continued his studies of history of art at the Johannes Gutenberg University of Mainz from 1979 to 1980. From 1981 to 1984 he was a member of the staff of the Museum Wiesbaden, where he was responsible for the exhibition Fluxus 62 as technical director. From 1986 to 1988 he was curator of the exhibition series Kunst at IFAGE in Wiesbaden. 2001 he was awarded a scholarship holder a scholarship by the  – . In 2005 he was awarded the 1st prize of the Sculpture Park of the town of Mörfelden-Walldorf. Since 2006 he is a member of the advisory board of the Künstlerhaus Schloss Balmoral. Since 2002 Heiner Thiel and Michael Post are working together on exhibition concepts and art installations in public spaces.

 Work 
Michael Post investigates the phenomena of perception in his objects:My own wall objects visualize the interactions between related surfaces; they are based on precise geometric structures.. He uses steel sheets, which are painted either on both sides or on one side with acrylic paint. They are attached to the wall by means of a magnetic device, so that they protrude out of the wall as a wall relief. The perspective and perception of the artwork changes depending on the viewing angle and the lighting conditions. These interactions are intended: Due to internal surface structures, an overall form is created that differs from the classic image formats and enters into a dialogue with the wall surface on which it is placed. Collections (selection)

 Sparkasse Hannover, Germany
 Kazimir Malevich Foundation, Moscow, Russia
 Ministry of Education, Science, Youth and Culture of the Federal State Rhineland-Palatinate, Mainz, Germany
 State Chancellery of the Federal State Rhineland-Palatinate, Mainz, Germany
 Artothek of the town Bonn, Germany
 Katholische Akademie der Diözese Rottenburg-Stuttgart, Weingarten Abbey, Weingarten, Germany
 Collection of the Landtag of Hesse, Wiesbaden, Germany
 Artothek of the town Wiesbaden, Germany
 Museum Wiesbaden
 Collection of the Company Industrieautomation Eckelmann, Wiesbaden, Germany
 Chamber of Industry and Commerce Wiesbaden, Germany
 The Hessen State Ministry for Higher Education, Research and the Arts, Wiesbaden, Germany
 New Town Hall, Wiesbaden, Germany
 Frankfurter Sparkasse, Frankfurt

 Solo exhibitions (selection) 

 2000: Michael Post:Bivalenzen, Museum Wiesbaden, Wiesbaden, Germany
 2001: Gallery Sonja Roesch, Houston, United States
 2004: Gallery Sonja Roesch, Houston, United States
 2004: Art Association, Kunstverein Frankenthal, Germany 
 2004:  Michael Post bei Peter Wesner - Für meine Freunde, Wiesbaden, Germany
 2010:  ("association of visual artists in the Middle Rhine"), Haus Metternich, Koblenz, Germany 
 2011: Sonnabend Galerie, Hofheim, Hesse, Germany
 2013: Michael Post - Au-delà Des Corps Idéaux, imprints-Galerie, Piégros-la-Clastre, France
 2016: Galerie Mariette Haas, Ingolstadt, Germany
 2017: Shine a Light, Galerie und Kunstkabinett Corona Unger, Bremen, Germany

 Group exhibitions (selection)

 1991: Cooperativa Emilarte, Town of Florence, Italy
 1991: Geistes Gegenwart, ("museum of Bochum"), Bochum, Germany
 1998: Galerie Sonja Roesch, Houston, United States
 2003: Ride-On,  Galerie Lindner, Vienna, Austria
 2005: Wandstücke, Galerie Wosimsky, Giessen, Germany    
 2005: 15 mal Konkret, Jubiläumsausstellung Galerie Wosimky, Giessen, Germany 
 2005: Skulpturen im Park, Gallery of the town of Mörfelden-Walldorf, Germany
 2006: Multiple Art und Originale, Edition Müller-Emil, Art association Altes Schützenhaus, Zofingen, Switzerland
 2006: In a Silent Dialogue I, Charlotte Jackson Fine Art, Santa Fe, United States
 2008: Kleinformate, Galerie La Ligne, Zürich, Switzerland
 2010: Here and After, Imprints Galerie, Piégros-la-Clastre, France 
 2012: Accrochage, Galerie Lindner, Vienna, Austria 
 2013: Embodying Colour, Museum Wiesbaden, Wiesbaden, Germany 
 2013: Colours of Space, Charlotte Jackson Fine Art, Santa Fe, United States 
 2014: Blue, Charlotte Jackson Fine Art, Santa Fe, United States
 2014: Wiesbaden trifft Zürich, Edition Multiple Art, Zürich, Switwerland
 2014: Embodying Colour, Budapest, Vasarely Museum, Hungary 
 2016: Vicissitudes of Color - Heiner Thiel & Michael Post, Charlotte Jackson Fine Art, Santa Fe, United States
 2017: In Between, Galerie m50, Oberursel, Germany 
 2017: Sleeping Beauty, Charlotte Jackson Fine Art, Santa Fe, United States

 Art in public places 
 1987: Design of the fountain at Wiesbaden-Sonnenberg
 1988: Kulturpyramide für die Ausstellung 40 Jahre Bundesrepublik Deutschland, (Exhibition of the Bundesarchivs on behalf of  Bundesrepublik Deutschland)
 2001:	Realisation of a  Wall installation (named Bivalenzen) at the Chamber of Industry and Commerce Wiesbaden, Germany
 2003: Design and configuration of a huge glass mural with coat of arms in the Coat of Arms-Hall of the Rhineland-Palatinate, Germany (together with Heiner Thiel) (temporary installation)
 2005: Mural Politeia in the foyer of the police headquarters, Western Palatinate, Kaiserslautern, Germany (with Heiner Thiel)
 2006: Design and configuration of a second huge glass mural in the Landtag Rhineland-Palatinate, Salle d'Amitié, the coat of arms of the twin towns and regions of Rhineland-Palatinate, Germany (with Heiner Thiel)
 2022: Together with the artist Heiner Thiel: Graphic painting at the bridging houses of  the Bad Kreuznach police station 

 Curatorial work 
 1995: Curator of the exhibition Wolfgang Mackrodt - Bildermacher at Museum Wiesbaden
 2013: Curator of the exhibition Embodying Colour at the Kunsthalle Wiesbaden (with Heiner Thiel)
 2014: Curator of the exhibition Embodying Colour Vasarely Museum, Budapest, Hungary 
 2015: Curator of the exhibition Embodying Colour at Haus Metternich, Koblenz, Germany (with Heiner Thiel)
 2017: Curator of the exhibition Hommage an Robert Preyer at the Kunsthaus Wiesbaden, with six of his former students: Heide Bastian, Michael Post, Eberhard Riedel, Hans-Joachim Sternhardt, Birgitta Weiss, Hans Zitko, Wiesbaden, Germany

 Further reading 
 Michael Post and Heiner Thiel (Hrsg.): Embodying Colour. With contributions of a.o. Matthias Bleyl, Invar-Torre Hollaus, Urs Bugmann, Hans Zitko.  Catalogue of the exhibition at the Kunsthalle Wiesbaden, 18. Oktober until 15 Dezember 2013, Ippenschied 2013, 
 Michael Post and Heiner Thiel (Hrsg.): Embodying Colour''. With contributions of a.o. Marcia Hafif, Dóra Maurer, Peter Fitz. Catalogue of the exhibition at the Vasarely Museum, 9. Oktober 2014 until 11. Januar 2015, Ippenschied 2014,

References

External links 
 
 website of Michael Post
 Michael Post at kunstaspekte.de
 Michael Post at artfacts.net

Concrete art
1952 births
German installation artists
20th-century German painters
20th-century German male artists
German male painters
Living people